Salamander Range is a distinctive linear range between the Canham and Black Glacier, in the Freyberg Mountains. Named by the Northern Party of New Zealand Geological Survey Antarctic Expedition (NZGSAE), 1963–64, from the nickname given to Lord Freyberg by Sir Winston Churchill, for the lizard that is untouched by fire.

Features
Geographical features of Salamander Range include:

 Canham Glacier
 Galatos Peak
 Mount Apolotok
 Mount Hennessey
 Mount Pedersen
 Mount Staley
 Mount Tukotok

Mountain ranges of Victoria Land
Pennell Coast